KIL-168 is a Project 141 (NATO reporting name: Kashtan class) large mooring/buoy tender of the Russian Navy, built by the Neptun Werft Shipyard in Rostock, East Germany, launched on 30 September 1989, and commissioned on 5 October 1990.

The Kashtan class tenders were developed from the Sura class, and are equipped with a 100-ton heavy lift gantry at the stern.  

KIL-168 is attached to the 34th Rescue Ships Brigade, Pacific Fleet and based at Vladivostok. In August 2005, it served as support in the rescue of the DSRV AS-28 after it became tangled in underwater antenna cables.

References

1990 ships
Auxiliary ships of the Russian Navy
Auxiliary ships of the Soviet Navy
Ships built in East Germany
Sea rescue